Jake Fenlason (born February 2, 1993) is an American soccer player who is retired.

Career

College
Fenlason played his entire college soccer career at the University of Akron between 2012 and 2015, including a red-shirted year in 2011.

Professional
Fenlason signed with United Soccer League side Orlando City B on February 4, 2016.

In January 31, 2018, Fenlason joined Saint Louis FC on a free transfer.

In 2020, Fenlason joined USL side San Diego Loyal SC in his home city when they were an expansion side.

References

External links
Akron Zips bio

1993 births
Living people
Akron Zips men's soccer players
American soccer players
Association football goalkeepers
Orlando City B players
Saint Louis FC players
San Diego Loyal SC players
Soccer players from San Diego
USL Championship players